Orile Ijaye is a small town located in Akinyele local government, Oyo state, Nigeria.  It is about 18 miles from Ibadan, Oyo state capital. This town was re-inhabited in 1895, thirty-two years after it was destroyed due to an intra-tribal and supremacy war with Ibadan; another military power at that time. It was in 1895 they named it, Orile Ijaye from the original name, Ijaye.

History 
The original occupants of Ijaye, were the Egbas, from the southern Yoruba tribe. They were mainly engaged in agricultural production. Between 1831 and 1833, the Fulani warriors from Ilorin, Kwara State attacked and captured several towns in northern Yorubaland. The displaced refugees from those towns taken by the Fulanis moved towards the south. Among the Oyo refugees who fled were warrior like, chiefs Kurunmi and Dado who led the army from a small town called Esiele. These refugee warriors initially settled at a village called Ika-Odan. Ika-Odan town became the abode of many Oyo warriors and generals who refused to acknowledge Ilorin's military authority but awaited the time when they would have the opportunity to defeat the Fulanis and then be able to go back to their various towns. They displaced the original inhabitants of Ika-Odan

Since these men were military warriors, they foraged into surrounding villages' farms for food. In 1833, those outlaws led by Dado, thereafter, attacked Ijaye town, who were Egba people; and drove away all the original inhabitants. They coveted possessions left behind by the original inhabitants and made Ijaye their permanent homes where they engaged in extensive farming except, Dado who continued his leadership as a warrior.  Dado would later become unrestrained. He would create false war alarms and had no regard for other war chiefs; until Kurunmi stood up to him and a civil war ensued. Dado with his wives and the small army were driven out of Ijaye. He wandered through several Yoruba towns including, Ibadan. After the death of his friend, Lakanle, an Ibadan war general, he became homeless. He would then return to Ijaye where he was murdered at the instance of Kurunmi.

Kurunmi drove away several war chiefs from Ijaye, who had to move about twelve miles to another village called  Akese. Because of the military might under Kurunmi's leadership and easy access to trade and agricultural produce, Ijaye was able to expand rapidly and attracted many refugees. Ijaye became a city-state comparable to Ibadan and Abeokuta. Kurunmi, as part of his plots, began to form alliances with other military powers, such as Ibadan, led by war general, Oluyole. He led several joint expeditions with Oluyole of Ibadan and both were especially close friends and contemporaries. A few cases were, Ibadan in the Gbanamu war against Chief Maye, who had been banished from Ibadan and his allied army. Also, during the Onidese war, Kurunmi requested and got help from Ibadan. The war arose when Kurunmi became envious of the growing popularity of the town. Between 1835 and 1836,  Kurunmi and his warriors were part of the final Yoruba military coalition in the failed Eleduwe war to take Ilorin back from the Fulani hegemony.

Before Ijaye war 
In 1837, Atiba Atobatele became the new King of Oyo, although the old Oyo had been decimated by the Fulani army of Ilorin. He installed, Kurunmi of Ijaye, as the Are-ona-Kakanfo or generalissimo of all Yoruba warriors. He would function to administer and protect Yoruba in the west. Oluyole of Ibadan was installed  Bashorun or prime minister. He would administer and protect Yoruba in the north and northeast. In 1847, Oluyole of Ibadan died. During his lifetime and leadership in Ibadan, the relationship with Kurunmi of Ijaye was mostly cordial and respectful. But it was at that time Ibadan grew and became a military powerhouse. It subdued many towns and villages; checkmated the Fulani of Ilorin during the Osogbo war. Ibadan leadership became hostile towards Kurunmi of Ijaye. In 1859, Atiba Atobatele, the Alaafin of Oyo, died and his son Adelu succeeded him. While the installation of Adelu was supported by Ibadan and many Yoruba kingdoms based on the new social reform approved by Atiba Atobatele before he was deceased, Kurunmi of Ijaye wanted the status quo, customs that stipulated that Adelu should have been made to die with his father. Therefore, Kurunmi refused to recognize the leadership of  King Adelu.

Ijaye war

1860 -1862 
By 1860, Ijaye had been built into a prosperous military powerhouse by Kurunmi comparable to Abeokuta and Ibadan. While Kurunmi, had become a veteran of several wars and an elder statesman, Ibadan had several leaders in successions after the death of Oluyole. By 1860, Chief Olugbode was the Baale of Ibadan (meaning lord or owner of the land). Among his military chiefs were Ibikunle, Balogun (or war general); Ogunmola, Otun (meaning Right-hand man). The Ijaye war with Ibadan was caused by; Ibadan’s attempts to become the sole power in Yorubaland; King Adelu to solidify his rulership in  Oyo. An opening to clash with Ijaye arose from a particular incidence. One Abu, a rich lady in Ijanna, a town under Ijaye, died without a will. Her property was supposed to revert to the Alaafin of Oyo. When King Adelu sent messengers to remove her properties to Oyo, Kurunmi’s war boys attacked the messengers and took them captive. All efforts by King Adelu to settle amicably were rebuffed by  Kurunmi. Therefore, Alaafin ordered Ibadan to declare war on Kurunmi of Ijaye.

On the 10th of April 1860, at the Ibadan council meeting, Balogun Ibikunle, the war general raised the standard of war against Ijaye. Unlike Ibadan with youthful warriors and modern weapons, Kurunmi of Ijaye was an old despotic leader. He had put to death several of Ijaye's brave warriors and forbade any chief from acquiring ammunitions to ensure his continuous rulership. It was not surprising his warriors had to result to fight with bows and arrows. Ijaye received support from towns, such as Egba, Ilorin, and Ijebu who saw Ibadan as the main threat and common enemy given her victories against Ijesa, Ekiti, Akoko, and Igbomina countries. The Ijaye war lasted two years. Ibadan and its allies defeated Ijaye and destroyed the town. In retaliation, Egba and Ijebu attacked and took Remo; Ijebu took Iperu and Egba seized Makun. These effectively closed the two main trade routes to the coast by the Ibadan.

In an attack led by Ogunmola, Otun or right-hand man of Ibadan, at Iwawun to cut off food supplies to Ijaye, through Oke-Ogun towns. Five of Kurunmi's sons, including Arawole, his eldest surviving child was caught and killed. The death of Kurunmi’s children dealt a severe blow to him. He died in June 1861. He was buried in a secret place by, Abogunrin, his head of slaves along with the two slaves who dug his grave. When his burial ground was later found, his head was cut off and taken to the Alaafin of Oyo, as the custom was for holders of Are-ona-kakanfo or generalissimo title demanded. Abogunrin took over the rulership of Ijaye town. All of Kurunmi’s treasures and properties including war weapons devolved to Abogunrin. He took all civil and military decisions. On the 17th of March 1862, Ijaye, a town rich and plenty in agriculture, full of brave and industrious men but under a dictatorship, fell to the hands of the Ibadan army. Abogunrin and other chiefs escaped to Abeokuta, where they were allocated portions of land to build their tents, and houses and re-establish themselves. They named it Ago Ijaye.

Integration into new societies 
The vicious war of Ijaye was achieved by massive destruction of farmland, people, and properties and starvation accomplished by the raised siege on the city town.  Ibadan military moved its permanent base to Alabata camp, which later grew into a village. Several Ijaye citizens migrated to the big towns of Ibadan, Abeokuta, Oyo, Lagos, and many other surrounding towns. Many Ijaye migrants who arrived in Ibadan came to join their relatives. Some came as captives and were employed in Ibadan farms or joined the military and were involved in expeditions. Some bought farmland but were excessively taxed. Ijaye refugees in Abeokuta came to meet the ones who had been displaced by Kurunmi in 1833.  Those had settled in locations called Ijaye Kukudi and Ijaye Obirinti. The new refugees settled in Sokenu landmarks where they received protection through the Christian missions in Abeokuta. A village called Ijaye-Ojutaye was established as a settlement for Ijaye migrants to Oyo; while those who relocated to a far place in Lagos, settled mostly in Abule-Ijaye around the Agege area.

1870 - 1895 
In the 1870s, relations of Kurunmi who were stationed in Abeokuta formed the Ile Are society and another Egbe Agba Ijaye society. The main objective was to re-establish and resettle back in their land. By 1893, they were so encouraged by the fact that Ibadan was now under colonial rule; and the need, in those days, for bigger farmland for cocoa, cotton, and rubber cash crops by the British. In 1895, Orile Ijaye was established. The early settlers were able to acquire huge land for cocoa farming and would later lease to late entrants. In the newly established, Orile Ijaye, Kurunmi relations were rejected to lead their monarchical-republican systems and they got support from Ibadan who had to impose, a man called, Olaniya. When Olaniya was deposed, another man, Fajinmi replaced him. But unlike the thriving Ijaye city-town destroyed by the war, Orile-Ijaye was and has since been a small village under Ibadan’s influence.

References 

Yoruba people
Yoruba warriors
Oyo Empire
Yoruba military personnel
Yoruba farmers
Yoruba royalty
Conflicts in 1860
Conflicts in 1861
Conflicts in 1862
1860 in Africa
1861 in Africa
1862 in Africa
Conflicts in Nigeria